This is a list of engineers and inventors from Cornwall, England, United Kingdom.

 John Arnold, watchmaker and pioneer of the marine chronometer
 William Bickford, inventor of the safety fuse
 Joseph Henry Collins, mining engineer, mineralogist and geologist 
 Sir John Coode, civil engineer
 William Cookworthy, discoverer of china clay (kaolinite) in Cornwall 
 Sir Humphry Davy, scientist, inventor and President of the Royal Society
 Sir Goldsworthy Gurney, inventor of limelight
Jonathan Hornblower, inventor of the compound engine and the steam valve 
 William Husband, civil and mechanical engineer
 Thomas Brown Jordan, engineer
 Michael Loam, inventor of the man engine
Sir Thomas Matthews, civil engineer and builder of lighthouses
 William Murdoch, engineer, inventor and sometime Cornish resident
 Andrew Pears, inventor of transparent soap
 William Westcott Rundell, inventor and engineer from Falmouth
 Adrian Stephens, inventor of the steam whistle
 Richard Tangye, engineer
 John Taylor, inventor of the Cornish rolls
Joseph Thomas, architect and civil engineer
 Joseph Treffry, engineer and industrialist
 Henry Trengrouse, inventor of a rocket-powered maritime rescue system
 Richard Trevithick, inventor, engineer and builder of the first steam locomotive
Robert Trewhella (1830-1909; :it:Robert Trewhella), railway engineer and contractor
 Andrew Vivian, Trevithick's cousin and collaborator, and captain of Dolcoath Mine
 Arthur Woolf, inventor of the high pressure compound steam engine

See also

List of Cornish scientists and inventors

References

Engineers and inventors
Cornish
Engineers and inventors